Tobolane "Benny" Kgarametso (born 30 August 1966) is a Botswana sprinter. He competed in the men's 200 metres at the 1988 Summer Olympics.

References

External links
 

1966 births
Living people
Athletes (track and field) at the 1988 Summer Olympics
Botswana male sprinters
Olympic athletes of Botswana
Place of birth missing (living people)